Parent article: List of comic strips; Siblings: A–F • G–O • P–Z

0–9
 2 Cows and a Chicken (2008–2011) by Steve Skelton (US)
 The 5th Wave (1981– ) by Rich Tennant (US)
 9 Chickweed Lane (1993– ) by Brooke McEldowney (US)
 9 to 5 (1990– ) by Harley Schwadron (US)
  (1959–1972) by Paul Gillon,  (France)
 91:an (1932– ) by Rudolf Petersson and others (Sweden)

A 
 Aaggghhh (2017– ) by Ham
 Aaron & Chris (2006– ) by Aaron Sawyer and Chris Rusher (US)
 Abe Martin of Brown County (1904–1930) by Kin Hubbard (US)
 Abbie an' Slats (1937–1971) originally by Al Capp and Raeburn van Buren (US)
 Abie the Agent (1914–1940) by Harry Hershfield (US)
 The Academia Waltz (1978–1979) by Berke Breathed (US)
 According to Guinness (1974–1990) by Norris McWhirter and Ross McWhirter, Bill Hinds (US)
 Ad Libs (1958–1975) by Jim Whiting and Larry Hurb, and later Len Bruh and Joe Daley (US)
 Adam@home (1984– ), first titled Adam, by Brian Basset (US)
 Adam Ames (1959–1962) by Lou Fine (US)
 Adamson (see Silent Sam)
 The Adventures of Smilin' Jack (1933–1973) by Zack Mosley (US)
 The Adventures of Tintin (1929–1944) by Hergé (Georges Remi) (Belgium)
 Agatha Crumm (1977–1996) originally by Bill Hoest, and later John Reiner, and Bunny Hoest (US)
 Aggie Mack (1946–1972), later titled Aggie, by Hal Rasmusson and later Roy L. Fox (US)
 Agnes (1999– ) by Tony Cochran (US)
 Air Hawk and the Flying Doctors (1959–1986) by John Dixon (Australia)
 Akwas (1964–1972) by Mike Roy (US)
 Al Khan (2008– ) by Tarek Shahin (Egypt)
 Alec the Great (1931–1969) by Edwina
 Alex (1987– ) by Charles Peattie and Russell Taylor (UK)
 Alexander Smart, Esq. (1930–1943) by A. C. Fera and later Doc Winner
 Alfredo (see )
 Aline (1996- ) by Adão Iturrusgarai (Brazil)
 All in a Lifetime (1935–1962) by Frank Beck (US)
 All in Sport (1952–1970) by Chet Adams (US)
 Alley Oop (1932–) originally by V. T. Hamlin (US)
 Alphonse and Gaston (1901–1904) by Frederick Burr Opper (US)
 An Altar Boy Named Speck (1951–1979) by Tut LeBlanc and later Margaret Ahern
 The Alumnae (1969–1976) by Mary Gauerke (US)
 Always Belittlin' (1930–1940) by Percy Crosby (US)
 Amal Aloy by Amal Chakrabarti (Southeast Asia)
 The Amazing Spider-Man (1977– ) by Stan Lee and John Romita, Sr. (US)
 Amazing Superpowers (2007– ) by Wes and Tony (US)
 The Ambassador (1933–1934) by Otto Soglow
 Amber Waves (2000– ) by Dave T. Phipps
 Ambler (1972–1973) by Doug Wildey (US)
 The American Adventure (1949–1951) by Bradford Smith and Dan Heilman (US)
 A. Mutt (see Mutt and Jeff)
 Amy (1962–1991) originally by Harry Mace (US)
 And Her Name Was Maud (1904–1932) by Frederick Burr Opper (US)
 Andy Capp (1957– ) originally by Reg Smythe (UK)
 Angel (1954–1963) by Mel Casson
 The Angriest Dog in the World (1983–1992) by David Lynch (US)
 Angus Og (?–1986) by Ewen Bain (Scotland)
 Animal Crackers (1968– ) by Roger Bollen and later Fred Wagner (US)
 Animal Crackers (1937–1957) by Dick Ryan and Warren Goodrich (US)
 Annie (see Little Orphan Annie)
 Apartment 3-G (1961–2015) originally by Nicholas P. Dallis and Alex Kotzky (US)
 A. Piker Clerk (1904) by Clare Briggs (US)
 Apple Mary (see Mary Worth) (1934–1939) originally by Martha Orr (US)
 Archie (1947– ) originally by Bob Montana (US)
 Arctic Circle (2007– ) by Alex Hallatt (New Zealand)
 The Argyle Sweater (2008– ) by Scott Hilburn (US)
 Arlo and Janis (1985– ) by Jimmy Johnson (US)
 Arnold (1983–1987) by Kevin McCormick (US)
 Art's Gallery (1962–1981) by Art Finley (US)
 Ask Shagg (1979– ) by Peter Guren (US)
 Assorted Nuts by Nick Barrameda (Philippines)
 Asterix and Obelix (1977– ) by René Goscinny and Albert Uderzo (US reprint of French album stories edited into comic strip form).
 At the Zü (1995–1998) by Ron Ruelle (US)
 Aunt Tenna (see Channel Chuckles) by Bil Keane (US)
 The Avridge Farm (1987–2005) by Jeff Wilson (Canada)
 Axa (1978–1986) by Enrique Badia Romero and Donne Avenell (UK)

B 
 Babe 'n' Horace (1939–1970) by Edgar Martin and later Les Carroll (US)
 Babe Bunting (1930–1939) by Frank Godwin (US)
 Baby Blues (1990– ) by Rick Kirkman and Jerry Scott (US)
 Baby Mine (1930–1939)
 Babyman, first titled The Great John L. (1982–1985) by Don Addis (US)
 Bachelor Party (2002–2003) by Adam Miller (US)
 Backbench (–) by Graham Harrop (Canada)
 Bad Reporter (2003– ) by Don Asmussen (US)
 The Badge Guys (1971–1973) by Charles Bowen and Ted Schwarz (US)
 Baldo (2000– ) by Hector Cantú and Carlos Castellanos (US)
 Ballard Street (1991– ) by Jerry Van Amerongen (US)
 Banana Oil (1923–c. 1930) by Milt Gross (later known as Gross Exaggerations, The Feitelbaum Family, and Looy Dot Dope) (US)
 Barnaby (1942–1952, 1960–1962) originally by Crockett Johnson (US)
 Barney Baxter (1935–1950) by Frank Miller (US)
 Barney Google and Snuffy Smith (1919– ) and (1934– ) respectively, by Billy DeBeck for both, and later Fred Lasswell for Snuffy (US), and starting in 2001 by John Rose (US)
 Baron Bean (1916–1919) by George Herriman (US)
 Basil (1974–1980) by Gerry Lants (Australia)
 Bat Masterson (1959–1970) by Ed Herron and Howard Nostrand (US)
 Batman (1989–1991) by Max Allan Collins and Marshall Rogers (US)
 Batman and Robin (1943–1974) originally by Bob Kane (US)
 B.C. (1958– ) by Johnny Hart (US)
 Be Scientific with Ol' Doc Dabble (1932–1935) by Harold Detje (US)
 Beau Peep (1978–2016) by Roger Kettle and Andrew Christine (UK)
 Beautyettes (1935) by Aldine Swank 
 Beelzebub Jones (1937–1945) by Hugh McClelland (UK)
 Benny & Mice (2003– ) by Benny Rachmadi (Indonesia)
 Beerkada (1999– ) by Lyndon Gregorio (Philippines)
 Beetle Bailey (1950– ) by Mort Walker, and later, Neal, Brian & Greg Walker (US)
 Belinda (1934?–1959), first titled Belinda Blue-Eyes, by Steve Dowling (UK)
 Belles and Wedding Bells (1930–1943) by Cliff Sterrett (US)
 Belvedere (1962–1995) by Nat Greenwood and George Webster Crenshaw (US)
 Ben (1996– ) by Daniel Shelton (Canada)
 Ben Bowyang (1933–1979) originally by Alex Gurney (Australia)
 Ben Casey (1962–1966) by Neal Adams (US)
 Ben Wicks (1967–1987) by Ben Wicks (Canada)
 Benjy (1973–1975) by Jim Berry and Bill Yates (US)
 Bent Offerings (1988–2004) by Don Addis (US)
 Berry's World (1963–2003) by Jim Berry (US)
 The Berrys (1943–1974) by Carl Grubert (US)
 Bert (1977– ) by Kamagurka (Belgium)
 Best Seller Showcase (1977–1978) by Elliot Caplin and Frank Bolle (US)
 The Better Half (1956–2014) originally by Bob Barnes (US)
 Betty (1919–1943) by Charles A. Voight (US)
 Betty (1991– ) by Gary Delainey and Gerry Rasmussen (Canada)
 Betty Boop (1934–1937, 1984–1988) originally by Max Fleischer, and later Grim Natwick (US)
 Between Friends (1994– ) by Sandra Bell-Lundy (Canada)
 Beyond Mars (1952–1955) by Jack Williamson and Lee Elias (US)
 Beyond the Black Stump (1988– ) by Sean Leahy (Australia)
 Biddie and Bert (1962–1965) by Bob Donovan (US)
 Big Ben Bolt (1950–1977) by John Cullen Murphy (US)
 Big Chief Wahoo (see Steve Roper and Mike Nomad)
 Big George (1960–1990) by Virgil Partch (US)
 Big Nate (1991– ) by Lincoln Peirce (US)
 Big Sister (1928–1972) by Les Forgrave and later Bob Naylor (US)
 Big Top (1937–1938) by Bill Walsh and Ed Wheelan
 Big Top (2002–2007) by Rob Harrell (US)
 Billy the Bee by Harry Smith (UK)
 Birdseye Centre (1927–1946) by Jimmy Frise (Canada)
 Bizarro (1986– ) by Dan Piraro (US)
 Blade Winters  (1952–1953) by Lafe Thomas and Ed Mann (US)
 Blast Blair (1963–1964) by Keith Willingham (US)
 Bleeker: The Rechargeable Dog (2007– ) by Jonathan Mahood (US)
 Blondie (1930– ) by Dean Young; originally by Chic Young (US)
 Bloom County (1980–1989) by Berke Breathed (US)
 The Blue Beetle (1940) by Charles Nicholas (Jack Kirby) (US)
 Bo (1940–1956) by Frank Beck (US)
 Bobby (1938–1985) by Jerry Iger (US)
 Bobby Sox (see Emmy Lou)
 Bobby Thatcher (1927–1937) by George Storm (US)
 Bob the Angry Flower (1992– ) by Stephen Notley (Canada)
 Boes (1980– ) by Wil Raymakers and Thijs Wilms (Netherlands)
 Bogor (1974?–1995?) by Burton Silver (New Zealand)
 Boner's Ark (1968–2000) by Mort Walker and later Frank B. Johnson (US)
 Bonnie (1956–1965) by Joe Campbell
 Bonzzo (1998– ) by John Rivas (Puerto Rico)
 Boob McNutt (1915–1934) by Rube Goldberg (US)
 Boomer (1973–1981), first titled Mixed Singles, by Mel Casson and William F. Brown (US)
 The Boondocks (1997–2006) by Aaron McGruder (US)
 Boots and Her Buddies (1924–1969) by Edgar Martin (US)
 The Born Loser (1965– ) originally by Art Sansom (US)
 Borovnica (1992– ) by Darko Macan (Croatia)
 Bouford (1949) by Frank Borth (US)
 Bound and Gagged (1992– ) by Dana Summers (US)
 Boy and Girl (1956–1974) by John Henry Rouson (US)
 The Boy Friend (1925–1926) by Marge Buell (US)
 Braggo the Monk by Gus Mager (US)
 Brainwaves by Betsy Streeter (US)
 Brass Hats (1971–1972) by Chuck Livolsi and Ralph Brem (US)
 Breaking Cat News (2017– ) by Georgia Dunn
 Brenda Breeze (1940–1962) by Rolfe Mason
 Brenda Starr, Reporter (1940–2011) originally by Dale Messick (US)
 Brevity (2005– ) by Guy Endore-Kaiser and Rodd Perry (US)
 Brewster Rockit: Space Guy! (2004– ) by Tim Rickard (US)
 Brick Bradford (1933–1987) originally by William Ritt and Clarence Gray (US)
 The Brilliant Mind of Edison Lee (2006– ) by John Hambrock (US)
 Bringing Up Father (1913–2000) originally by George McManus (also known as Maggie and Jiggs) (US)
 Briny Deep (1980–1981) by Don Addis (US)
 Bristow (1962–2016) by Frank Dickens (UK)
 Broadside (1986– ) by Jeff Bacon (US)
 Bronc Peeler (1933–1938) by Fred Harman (US)
 Broom Hilda (1970– ) by Russell Myers (US)
 The Broons (1936– ) by Dudley D. Watkins (Scotland)
 Brother Juniper (1958–89) by Fred McCarthy
 Brother Sebastian (1954–1971) by Chon Day (US)
 Brown Boys (1930's) by John Jay Humski
 Bruce Gentry (1945–1951) by 
 Brutus (1929–1938) by Johnny Gruelle (US)
 Buck Nix (1908– ) by Sidney Smith (US)
 Buck Rogers (1929–1967) originally by Dick Calkins and Philip Nolan; (1979–1983) originally by Gray Morrow and Jim Lawrence (US)
 Buck Ryan (1937–1962) by Jack Monk (UK)
 The Buckets (1990– ) by Greg Cravens; originally by Scott Stantis (US)
 Buckles (March 25, 1996 – March 21, 2021 ) by David Gilbert (US)
 Bughouse Fables (1924–1935) by Billy DeBeck, and later Paul Fung and Jay Irving (US)
 Bugs Bunny (1944–1990) originally by Leon Schlesinger (US)
 The Bungle Family (1918–1945) first titled Home Sweet Home by Harry J. Tuthill (US)
 Bunky (1936–1947) by Billy DeBeck and later Fred Lasswell (US)
 Burn of the Week (1970s) by Mad Peck (US)
 Burntside (2008–2009) by Ray Denty (Canada)
 Buster (1960–2000) (UK)
 Buster Brown (1902–1920) by Richard F. Outcault (US)
 Buz Sawyer (1943–1989) originally by Roy Crane (US)
 B. Virtanen (1989– ) by Ilkka Heilä (Finland)

C 
 Caesar (1946–1960) by William Timym (UK)
 Café con Leche (2007–2014) by Charlos Gary (US)
 Calvin and Hobbes (1985–1995) by Bill Watterson (US)
 Campus Clatter (1969–1976) by Larry Lewis (US)
 Candorville (2003– ) by Darrin Bell (US)
 Candy (1944–1971) by Harry Sahle and later Tom Dorr (US)
 The Candy Man (1981– ) by Bill Murray (US)
 Cap Stubbs and Tippie (1918–1966) by Edwina Dumm (US)
 Cappy Dick (1939–1987) by Robert Cleveland, and later Rick Yager and Bob Weber, Jr. (US)
 The Captain and the Kids (see The Katzenjammer Kids)
 Captain Easy (1929–1988) originally by Roy Crane (US)
 Captain Kate (1967–1971) by Jerry Skelly, Hale Skelly and Archie Goodwin (US)
 Captain Wings (1946–1947) by "Flowers"
 The Captain's Gig (1977–1979) by Virgil Partch ("VIP") (US)
 Carmichael (1958–1985) by Dave Eastman (US)
 Carnival (1939–1980) by J. A. Patterson and Dick Turner (US)
 Carol Day (1956–1967) by David Wright (UK)
 Carrie and Her Car (1923–1926) by Wood Cowan (US)
 Casey Ruggles (1949–1954) by Warren Tufts (US)
 Catfish (1973–1994) by Reg Bollen (US)
 Cathy (1976–2010) by Cathy Guisewite (US)
 Cats with Hands (1999– ) by Joe Martin (US)
 Cattivik (1970– ) originally by Bonvi (Franco Bonvicini) (Italy)
 C'est La Vie by Jennifer Babcock
 Cecil C. Addle (1975–1997) by Ray Collins (US)
 Channel Chuckles (1954–1977) by Bil Keane (US); (1988– ) by various artists
 Charisma Man (1998–2006) by Larry Rodney (Japan)
 Charlie Chan (1938–42) by Alfred Andriola (US)
 Charlie Chaplin's Comic Capers (1915–1917) by Stuart Carothers and later Elzie Segar (US)
 Le Chat (1983–2013) by Philippe Geluck (Belgium)
 Chelsea Boys (1998– ) by Glen Hanson and Allan Neuwirth (US)
 Chicken Wings (2001– ) by Michael Strasser (US) and Stefan Strasser (Austria)
 Ching Chow (1927–1971) by Sidney Smith, and later Stanley Link and Will Henry; (1975–1980) by Rocco Lotito, Will Levinson and Henri Arnold
 Chintoo (1989– ) by Charu has Pandit and Prabhakar Wadekar (India)
 Chip Collins Adventures (1934–1935) by William Ritt and Jack Wilhelm (US)
 The Chosen Family (1988–2004) by Noreen Stevens (Canada)
 Chris Crusty (1931–1940) by Charles Plumb and William Conselman (US)
 Chris Welkin, Planeteer (1952–1964) by Art Sansom and Russ Winterbotham
 Chuck Billy (1961- ) formerly Hiroshi e Zezinho, by Mauricio de Sousa (Brazil)
 Cicero's Cat by Al Smith
 Cigarman (1997–1998) by Sam Gross
 The Circus of P.T. Bimbo (1975–1980) by Howie Schneider (US)
 The Cisco Kid (1951–1967) by Jose Luis Salinas and Rod Reed
 Citizen Dog (1995–2001) by Mark O'Hare (US)
 Citizen Smith (1967–1984) by Dave Gerard
 The City (1990– ) by Derf Backderf (John Backderf) (US)
 City Hall (1957–1984) by Dave Gerard
 Claire Voyant (1943–1948) by Jack Sparling (US)
 Clare in the Community (2001?– ) by Harry Venning (UK)
 Clarence (1924–1948) by Crawford Young, and later Cady, Frank Fogarty, and Weare Holbrook
 Clear Blue Water (2004– ) by Karen Montague-Reyes (US)
 Cleats (2001–2010) by Bill Hinds (US)
 Clemente (1973–2012) by Caloi (AR)
 Clementine (1965–?) by Bob Stevens (US)
 The Cloggies by Bill Tidy (UK)
 Close to Home (1992– ) by John McPherson (US)
 Clout Street (1983–1984) by Dick Locher (US)
 Clovis and Tom-Tom (1960–1979) by R Eagle (Canada)
 Colonel Gilfeather (1930–1934) originally by Richard W. Dorgan (also known as Mister Gilfeather and The Gay Thirties) (US)
 Colonel Potterby and the Duchess (1935–1963) by Chic Young
 The Colonials aka Colonial Capers (1970–1976) by Joe Escourido (US)
 Color Blind (1998–1999) by Orrin Brewster and Tony Rubino (US)
 Comedy Corner (1961–1970)
 Committed (1994–2006) by Michael Fry (US)
 Common Man by RK Laxman (India)
 Compu-toon (1994– ) by Charles Boyce (US)
 Conchy (1970–1977) by James Childress (US)
 Condorito (1949– ) by Pepo (René Ríos) (Chile)
 Connie (1927–1944) by Frank Godwin
 Conrad (1982–1986) by Bill Schorr (US)
 Cooper (1985–1986) by Tim Menees and Mike Keefe
 Copps and Robberts (1979–1981) by Jerry Scott and Rick Kirkman
 Cornered (1996– ) by Mike Baldwin (Canada)
 Cotton Woods (1955–1958) by Ray Gotto and Don Sherwood
 Count Screwloose from Tooloose (1929–1935) by Milt Gross (US)
 A Couple of Guys (1996– ) by Dave Brousseau (US)
 Cousin Juniper (1945–1954) by Gus Edson
 Cow and Boy (2006– ) by Mark Leiknes (US)
 Cowboy Henk (1981– ) by Kamagurka and Herr Seele (Belgium).
 Crabby Road by John Wagner and the Hallmark Cards, Inc. writing studios (1997–2002; continued as a web comic to the present) (US)
 Crankshaft (1987– ) by Tom Batiuk and Chuck Ayers (US)
 Crawford and Morgan aka Crawford (1976–1978) by Chuck Jones (US)
 Crock (1975–2012) by Bill Rechin and later Brant Parker and Don Wilder (US)
 Crosstown (1934–1953) by Roland Coe (US)
 Cubitus (1968; comic albums: 1977–2006) created by Dupa (Belgian)
 Cul de Sac (2007–2012) by Richard Thompson, inked by Stacy Curtis (US)
 Curbside (1991– ) by Robert Kirby (US)
 Curly Harper (1935–1944) by Lyman Young
 Curtis (1988– ) by Ray Billingsley (US)
 Cuties (1942–1970) by E. Simms Campbell
 Cynical Susie (1933–1937) by Laverne Harding and later Bernard Dribble (US)
 Cynthia (1946–1952) by Irv Novick

D 
 Daddy's Home (2008– ) by Tony Rubino and Gary Markstein (US)
 Daffy Demonstrations (1926) by Ray Rohn (US)
 The Dailys (1948–1957) by Stanley Link (US)
 Dan Dunn (1933–1943) by Norman Marsh (US)
 Dan Flagg (1963–1967) by Don Sherwood (US)
 Dark Shadows (1971–1972) by Ken Bald (Credited as 'K. Bruce' due to contractual obligation) (US)
 Dateline: Danger! (1968–1974) by Al McWilliams and John Saunders (US)
 Dave (1992–1999) by David Miller (US)
 Dave's Delicatessen (1931–?) by Milt Gross (US)
 David Crane (1956–1972) by Win Mortimer and later Creig Flessel
 Davy Jones (1961–1970) by Al McWilliams and Sam Leff
 Day by Day (2002– ) by Chris Muir (US) – webcomic, ran in newspaper syndication 2005–2007
 Day Shift (1953–1964) by Frank Adams
 Deb Days (1927) by Charles Coll (US)
 Debbie Dean (1942–1949) by Bert Whitman (US)
 Debbie Deere (1966–1969) by Frank Bolle (US)
 Deflocked (2008– ) by Jeff Corriveau (US)
 Dennis Dull (1993) by Phil Young (US)
 Dennis the Menace (1951– ) originally by David Law (UK)
 Dennis the Menace (1951– ) by Hank Ketcham (US)
 Denver Square (1997–2008) by Ed Stein (US)
 Desperate Desmond (1910–1912), by Harry Hershfield (US)
 Diamond Lil (2008– ) by Brett Koth
 Dick Tracy (1931– ) originally by Chester Gould (US)
 Dickie Dare (1933–1957) originally by Milton Caniff (US)
 Diesel Sweeties (online 2000–, in print 2007–2008 ) by Rich Stevens (US)
 Dilbert (1989– ) by Scott Adams (US)
 Dillon (1989–1992) by Steve Dickenson (US)
 The Dingbat Family (1910–1916) aka The Family Upstairs, by George Herriman (US)
  (1930–1951) by H. H. Knerr (US)
 The Dinette Set (1990–2015), first titled Suburban Torture, by Julie Larson (US)
 Disney Christmas Story (1960–1987), by various creators of Disney
 Divot Diggers (1929–1940) by Dick Dorgan, and later Vic Forsythe and Pete Llanuza
 Dixie Dugan (1929–1966) by J. P. McEvoy and John H. Striebel (US)
 Dizzy Dramas (1927–1943) by Joe Bowers (US)
 Doc (1925) by Hy Gage (US)
 Doctor Funshine (1963–1966) by Bill Weber
 Dr. Guy Bennett (1957–1964) by E.C. Douglas and Frank Thorne (US)
 Dr. Kildare (1962–1983) by Ken Bald
 Doctor Smock (1974–1985) by George Lemont (US)
 Doctor X (1946–1947) by M. R. Mont
 Dog eat Doug (2004– ) by Brian Anderson (US)
 Doings of the Duffs (1914–1931) by Walter R. Allman and later Ben Batsford (US)
 Dolly Burns (see Spence Easley)
 Dok's Dippy Duck (1917–1925) by John Hager (US)
 Don Q (1975–1981) by David Gantz (US)
 Don Winslow of the Navy (1934–1955) by Frank V. Martinek and Leon A. Beroth (US)
 Donald Duck (1938–1995), nominally by Walt Disney, originally by Bob Karp and Al Taliaferro (US)
 Dondi (1955–1986) originally by Gus Edson and Irwin Hasen (US)
 Don't Do That (1950–1956) by Sylvia Robbins (US)
 Doodles (1985– ) by Steve Sack and Craig Macintosh (US)
 Dooley's World (1972–1978) by Roger Bradfield (US)
 Doonesbury (1970– ) by Garry Trudeau (US)
 Dot and Carrie (1922–1962) by J. F. Horrabin (UK)
 Dotty Dripple (1944–1974) by Buford Tune (US)
 Down the Road (1920–1937), later titled Gas Buggies and Hem and Amy, by W. E. Buck and later Frank Beck (US)
 Downstown (1974–1986) by Tim Downs (US)
 Downtown Kid (2008–2009) by Matt Grant (Canada)
 Drabble (1979– ) by Kevin Fagan (US)
 Drago (1945–1946) by Burne Hogarth (US)
 Dramatic Events in Bible History by Walt Scott (1927–1929)
 Dream of the Rarebit Fiend (1904–1913) by Silas (Winsor McCay) (US)
 Drift Marlo (1961–1971) by T. M. Levitt, Phil Evans, and Tom Cooke
 Droodles (1953) by Roger Price
 The Dropouts (1968–1981) by Howard Post
 Dudley D. (1961–1964) by Dave Gantz
 Duffy (1981–1996) by Bruce Hammond
 Dumb Bells (1925–1954) by Joe Cunningham and Gar Schmitt
 Dumb Dora (1924–1935) by Chic Young, and later Paul Fung and Bill Dwyer
 The Dumplings (1975–1976) by Fred Lucky
 Dunagin's People (1969–2001), first titled Tell It Like It Is, by Ralph Dunagin
 The Duplex (1993– ) by Glenn McCoy (US)
 Dustin (2010– ) by Steve Kelley and Jeff Parker (US)
 Dykes to Watch Out For (1983–2008) by Alison Bechdel

E 
 Eb and Flo (1967–1986) by Paul Sellers
 Edge City (2000–2016) by Terry LaBan and Patty LaBan (US)
 Eek and Meek (1965–2000) by Howie Schneider (US)
 Effie Spunk (1935) by F. O. Alexander (US)
 The Elderberries (2004–2012) by Phil Frank and Joe Troise (US)
 Ella Cinders (1925–1961) by Bill Conselman and Charles Plumb
 Elmer (1926–1956) by A. C. Fera, and later Doc Winner
 Elsie Hooper (2002– ) by Robert D. Krzykowski (US)
 Elvis (2000– ) by Tony Cronstam (Sweden)
 Elwood (1983–1990) by Ben Templeton and Tom Forman (US)
 Em (2006– ) by Maria Smedstad (UK)
 Emmy Lou (1944–1979), first titled Bobby Sox, by Marty Links
 Ensign Bafflestir (1971–1974) by Ron Marlett (US)
 Eric de Noorman (1946–1964) by Hans G. Kresse (Netherlands)
 Ernie by Dave Gibbons (UK)
 Ernie (see The Piranha Club)
 Et Tu (1975–1976) by Dan Harper (US)
 Etta Kett (1925–1974) by Paul Robinson (US)
 Ever Happen to You? (1954–1965) by Bud Blake
 Everyday Movies (1924–1954) by various creators, including Denys Wortman
 Everyday People (1999– ) by Cathy Thorne (CAN)
 Executive Suite (1985– ) by Jack Lindstrom and William Wells
 Eyebeam (1980–1990) by Sam Hurt (US)

F 
 Fair Game (1996–1998) by Stephanie Piro (US)
 Fakta fra verden (2001– ) by Karstein Volle (Norway)
 The Family Circus (1960– ), first named The Family Circle, by Bil Keane (US)
 Family Tree (2007–2011) by Signe Wilkinson (US)
 Fan Fare (1948–1972) by Walt Ditzen
 The Fantastic Foster Fenwick (1968–1972) by Malcolm Hancock (US)
 The Far Side (1980–1995) by Gary Larson (US)
 Farcus (1991– ) by David Waisglass and Gordon Coulthart (US)
 Farley (1975–2007), first named Travels with Farley, by Phil Frank (US)
 Farming Today (1983– ) by Ernie Riggs
 Fat Cats (1998– ) by Charlie Podrebarac (US)
 Fatty Finn (1923–1933, 1951–1977) by Syd Nicholls (Australia)
 Featherheads (1926–1936) by F.O. Alexander (US)
 Feiffer (1959–1973) by Jules Feiffer
 Felix the Cat (1923–1946) by Pat Sullivan, and later Otto Messmer and Joe Oriolo (US)
 Fenwick (1977–1979) by Malcolm Hancock (US)
 Ferd'nand (1937–2012) originally by Mik (Henning Dahl Mikkelsen) (Denmark)
 Fetus-X (1999– ) by Eric Millikin
 Fiddlestix (1988– ) by Michael Pohrer
 The Figgers Family (1927–1928) by Victor E. Pazmiño (US)
 Figments (1971–1988) by Dale Hale
 Fingerpori (2007– ) by Pertti Jarla
 Finney of the Force (1925–1931) by F.O. Alexander (US)
 Fisher (1992– ) by Philip Street (Canada)
 Flamingo (1952–1985) by Matt Baker, and later Ruth Roche, ** * John Thornton, Thorn Stevenson and Ruth Schaefer
 Flapper Fanny Says (1924–ca.1940), by Ethel Hays, and later Gladys Parker and Sylvia Sneiderman (US)
 Flash Gordon (1934–2003) by Alex Raymond (US)
 Fletcher the 4-H'r (1958–1986) by Joe E. Buresch
 The Flibbertys (1953–1972) by Ray Helle (US)
 Flight Deck (1998– ) by Peter Waldner (US)
 The Flintstones (1962–late 1990s) by Hanna-Barbera Productions
 Flo & Friends (2002– ) by Jenny Campbell, created by John Gibel
 Flook (1949–?) by Trog (Wally Fawkes) (UK)
 The Flop Family (1945–1981) by George O. Swanson
 Flubs and Fluffs (1966–1988) by Jerry Robinson (US)
 Flyin' Jenny (1939–1946) by Russell Keaton (US)
 The Flying McCoys (2005– ) by Glenn McCoy and Gary McCoy (US)
 Fluff (1968– ) by Nina Paley (US)
 F Minus (2002– ) by Tony Carrillo (US)
 Fogarty (1975–1976) by Bill Lee
 Foolish Questions (1908–1934) by Rube Goldberg (US)
 Footprints on the Sands of Time (1929, 1931–1937) by Clare Victor Dwiggins (US)
 Footrot Flats (1975–1999) by Murray Ball (New Zealand)
 For Better or For Worse (1979–2008) by Lynn Johnston (Canada)
 For Heaven's Sake (1991– ) by Mike Morgan
 Fortune Kookies (1973–1977) by Charles Glass
 Forever Female (1961–1974) by Dorothy Mylrea and later Eugene Craig
 The Fosdyke Saga (1971–1985) by Bill Tidy (UK)
 FoxTrot (1988– ) by Bill Amend (US) (NOTE: Sunday-only run since 2007)
 Foxy Grandpa (1900–1918) by Carl E. Schultze (US)
 Francie (1986–1996) by Sherrie Shepherd
 Frank and Ernest (1972– ) by Bob Thaves (US)
 Frank Merriwell's Schooldays by Gilbert Patten & Jack Wilhelm (1931–1934)
 Franka (1973– ) by Henk Kuijpers (Netherlands)
 Frankie Doodle (1934–1938), first named The Doodle Family, by Ben Batsford (US)
 Frazz (2000– ) by Jef Mallett (US)
 Freckles and His Friends (1915–1973) by Merrill Blosser and later Henry Formhals (US)
 Fred (1983–1992) by Leonard Bruce and Charles Durck
 Fred Basset (1963– ) by Alex Graham (UK)
 Freddie, the Sheik (1922–1929) by Jack Callahan
 Freddy (1956–1980) by Robert Baldwin (aka Rupe)
 Free Range (2007– ) by Bill Whitehead (US)
 Free Zone (1985–1990) by Winthrop Prince
 Friday Foster (1970–1974) originally by Jim Lawrence and Jorge Longarón (US)
 Fritz (1982– ) by various, including Fritz
 Fritzi Ritz (see Nancy)
 Frog Applause (2006– ) by Teresa Burritt (US) (see https://www.gocomics.com/frogapplause)
 From Earth by Ricky King (Canada)
 From 9 to 5 (1946–1971) by Jo Fischer
 Frontiers of Science (1962–1987) by Professor Stuart Butler and Robert Raymond (Australia)
 Frumpy the Clown (1996–1998) by Judd Winick (US)
 Funky Winkerbean (1972– ) by Tom Batiuk (US)
 Funland (1933–1979) by Art Nugent and later Art Nugent, Jr.
 Funny Business (1942–1956) by Ralph Hershberger; (1969–1979) by Rog Bollen
 Funnyman (1944) by Jerry Siegel and Joe Shuster (US)
 The Funsters (1964–1986) by John Broudhecker
 Fur-and-Feather Land (1940s, 1950s, e.g. The Age, 7 June 1940) 
 The Fusco Brothers (1989– ) by J. C. Duffy (US)
 Fuzzy (1983–1992) by Leonard Bruce

References

Sources
 

A-F